City College station is a light rail station on the San Diego Trolley's Orange, Blue, and Silver Lines. It is located in the East Village neighborhood of the city and serves students at San Diego City College and San Diego High School, workers at warehouse facilities located on the outskirts of Downtown, and an increasing number of new apartment complexes.

This station was closed from September 10, 2012 until November 16, 2012, for renovations as part of the Trolley Renewal Project, during which a temporary stop was erected one block away on C Street between 10th and 11th Avenues.

Station layout
There are two tracks, each with a side platform. Silver Line heritage service operates Friday through Sunday only.

See also
 List of San Diego Trolley stations

References

Blue Line (San Diego Trolley)
Orange Line (San Diego Trolley)
Silver Line (San Diego Trolley)
Railway stations in the United States opened in 1981
San Diego Trolley stations in San Diego
1981 establishments in California
Railway stations in California at university and college campuses